Frederick Michael Daly  (13 June 1912 – 2 August 1995) was an Australian politician who served as a member of the House of Representatives from 1943 to 1975, representing the Labor Party. In the Whitlam Government he was Leader of the House, Minister for Services and Property, and Minister for Administrative Services.

Early life
Daly was born on 13 June 1912 in Currabubula, New South Wales. He was the ninth of eleven children born to Margaret Jane (née Howard) and Michael Daly. His father, born in Ireland, was a farmer and grazier.

After his father's death in 1923 the property was sold and the family moved to Sydney and settled in North Bondi. He attended Waverley College, where he "hated school and failed most of his examinations". He left school at the age of 13 and began working for Bennett & Wood, a bicycle manufacturing firm, as a messenger boy and clerk. During World War II Daly worked for the Department of Navy under the orders of the Manpower Directorate. He was an official in the New South Wales branch of the Federated Clerks' Union of Australia.

Politics

At the 1943 election he was endorsed by the Labor Party for the seat of Martin in the Inner West of Sydney.  This was considered a safe United Australia Party seat but Daly unexpectedly won. He rapidly established himself as a skilled and witty debater, and became a protégé of Ben Chifley, Labor Prime Minister from 1945.

Labor was defeated at the 1949 election, at which Daly shifted to the safe Labor seat of Grayndler. Daly spent the next 23 years as an opposition frontbencher – one of a generation of Labor politicians whose career opportunities were greatly reduced by the splits and internal conflicts of the 1950s and 1960s. As a right-wing Catholic, Daly had many sympathies with the right-wing group which left the Labor Party in 1955 and later formed the Democratic Labor Party, but he remained loyal to the party and defeated several attempts by the left to challenge his party endorsement.

Daly became well known as one of the great humorists of the House. Among his well-known lines were: "The Country Party has two election policies – one for people and one for sheep", and "He (Billy Snedden) couldn't lead a flock of homing pigeons".

Whitlam Era
From 1967 onwards Daly was a strong supporter of Gough Whitlam in his battles with the left wing of the party, and in 1969 Whitlam made him Shadow Minister for Immigration. But his support for retaining some elements of the White Australia Policy in Labor's platform caused Whitlam to remove him from the portfolio. When Labor won the 1972 election – by which time Daly was the Father of the House – he became Minister for Services and Property (in 1974 renamed Administrative Services), responsible for the Department of Services and Property.

This put Daly in charge of, among other things, the Australian Electoral Commission, and he tried to pass legislation which would have abolished the malapportionment of electorates in favour of rural areas (see Australian electoral system), but his bills were defeated in the Senate. After the 1974 election he was able to get many of his reforms to the electoral system passed.

He was also Leader of the House throughout the Whitlam government.

After the Whitlam government was dismissed by the Governor-General, Sir John Kerr in November 1975, Daly announced he would retire from parliament and not contest the December election. He delayed his announcement until the last minute, to ensure that Whitlam's son Tony Whitlam was able to secure endorsement for Grayndler without opposition.

Later life
In retirement Daly published two volumes of humorous memoirs, From Curtin to Kerr and The Politician who Laughed. He remained active in the New South Wales Labor Party until his death in 1995, when he was accorded a state funeral at St Brigid's Church, Marrickville, attended by a huge crowd of Labor loyalists. At the time of his death, he was the last surviving person to have served as a member of parliament during the Curtin and Forde governments and the surviving former MP with the earliest date of first election.

See also
List of longest-serving members of the Parliament of Australia

References

 

1912 births
1995 deaths
1975 Australian constitutional crisis
Australian Labor Party members of the Parliament of Australia
Members of the Australian House of Representatives
Members of the Australian House of Representatives for Grayndler
Members of the Australian House of Representatives for Martin
Leaders of the Australian House of Representatives
Officers of the Order of Australia
20th-century Australian politicians
Australian memoirists
20th-century memoirists
Australian people of Irish descent